Island council elections were held in the Caribbean Netherlands on 18 March 2015 to elect the members of the island councils of Bonaire, Saba and Sint Eustatius. The elections were held on the same day as the provincial and water board elections in the European Netherlands. The election was won by the Movement of Bonaire People (3 seats) in Bonaire, the Windward Islands People's Movement (3 seats) in Saba, and the Progressive Labour Party (2 seats) in Sint Eustatius.

Results

Bonaire

Saba

Sint Eustatius

References

Dutch
Island council
March 2015 events in North America
2015 in Bonaire
Elections in Bonaire
Elections in Saba (island)
Elections in Sint Eustatius